Banz may refer to:

 Banz Abbey, Bavaria, Germany
 Banz (Papua New Guinea), Western Highlands Province, Papua New Guinea 
 Gary Banz, Republican Oklahoma State Representative
 Stefan Banz (1961–2021), artist and curator
 Nikolaus of Banz, Catholic canon